Juan Manuel Zubeldía (born 19 August 1979) is an Argentine football manager and former player who played as a midfielder. He is the current manager of Ecuadorian club Deportivo Cuenca along with Gabriel del Valle.

Playing career
Zubeldía was born in Santa Rosa, La Pampa, and made his senior debut with Racing Club on 16 June 1999, scoring in a match against Newell's Old Boys. After featuring rarely, he moved to Huracán de Tres Arroyos in 2001.

Zubeldía subsequently joined Villa Mitre in 2002, but played sparingly. In 2004, after rejecting offers from Italian clubs, he signed for Candelaria, but suffered an injury and the club terminated his contract.

Zubeldía also played for Ferro Carril Oeste between 2006 and 2010, retiring with the club at the age of 31.

Managerial career
After retiring, Medina joined Gabriel Schürrer's staff at Lanús, as his assistant. He continued to work with Schürrer in the following years, at Argentinos Juniors, Crucero del Norte and Gimnasia y Esgrima de Jujuy.

In December 2015, Zubeldía was named manager of General Belgrano de Santa Rosa, but resigned the following 27 September. He then rejoined Schürrer's staff at Deportivo Cuenca, later working with the manager at Independiente del Valle, Aucas, Blooming, Mitre (SdE) and back at Cuenca.

On 12 December 2022, Zubeldía was named manager of Cuenca for the 2023 season, with compatriot Gabriel del Valle who was also an assistant of Schürrer.

References

External links

1970 births
Living people
Footballers from Buenos Aires
Argentine footballers
Association football midfielders
Argentine Primera División players
Racing Club de Avellaneda footballers
Huracán de Tres Arroyos footballers
Villa Mitre footballers
Ferro Carril Oeste footballers
Argentine football managers
C.D. Cuenca managers
Argentine expatriate football managers
Expatriate football managers in Ecuador